Eismeer is the thirteenth studio album by Peter Frohmader, released in 2003 by Gazul Records.

Track listing

Personnel 
Adapted from the Eismeer liner notes.
 Peter Frohmader – instruments, cover art
 Pit Holzapfel – trombone, baritone saxophone and guitar (3)
 Jürgen Jung – spoken word (1)
 Brigitte Wagner – vocals (3)

Release history

References 

2003 albums
Peter Frohmader albums